Abbasabad-e Pisht (also Romanized as ‘Abbāsābād-e Pīsht; also known as ‘Abbāsābād) is a village in Zeydabad Rural District, in the Central District of Sirjan County, Kerman Province, Iran. At the 2006 census, its population was 65, in 23 families.

References 

Populated places in Sirjan County